Robert (or Bob, Bobby, or Rob) Wheeler may refer to:

People 
Mortimer Wheeler (Robert Eric Mortimer Wheeler, 1890–1976), archaeologist
Robert E. Wheeler, Brigadier General
Robert L. Wheeler (1920–1992), U.S. Hall of Fame racehorse trainer
Robert Wheeler (chess player), see Jamaican Chess Championship
 Robert Wheeler, electoral candidate of Future New Zealand party for the New Zealand general election, 1999
 Bob Wheeler (1952–2010), American middle-distance runner
 Bob Wheeler, editor of Italian films Monster Shark and Blastfighter
 Bobby Wheeler, co-singer of "Coward of the County" in the album, Urban Chipmunk
 Rob Wheeler, New Zealand Evangelist of New Life Churches, New Zealand
 Rob Wheeler, former radio presenter of Heart South Devon, radio station in United Kingdom
 Rob Wheeler, chairman of the Bardon Latrobe Junior Soccer Club

Fictional 
 Bob Wheeler, fictional character of Night Court, portrayed by Brent Spiner
 Bob Wheeler, fictional character of Bob Hearts Abishola, portrayed by Billy Gardell
 Bob Wheeler, pseudonymous name of fictional character, Martin Fitzgerald
 Bobby Wheeler (Taxi), fictional character, portrayed by Jeff Conaway
 Bobby Wheeler, fictional character of Clarence, portrayed by Robert Agnew
 Rob Wheeler, fictional character of science fiction novel, Macrolife
 Robert Wheeler, fictional character of Courage the Cowerdly Dog alternate reality game

See also
 Robert Wheler, English local historian
 Bert Wheeler (1895–1968), star of the Wheeler & Woolsey team in American comedy films